Barco e Coutada is a civil parish in the municipality of Covilhã, Portugal. It was formed in 2013 by the merger of the former parishes Barco and Coutada.

References

Freguesias of Covilhã